The Ministry of Small and Medium Enterprises, Commerce and Business Environment of Romania was one of the ministries of the Government of Romania.

The Ministry was founded during the Tăriceanu II government, and was known as the "Ministry of Small and Medium Enterprises, Commerce, Tourism and Liberal Occupations". During the Boc I government, the tourism portfolio was split off to form a separate Ministry of Tourism.

It was dissolved in December 2009.

External links
 www.mimmctpl.ro
 Tourism
 GUV.ro

Small and Medium Enterprises, Commerce and Business Environment
Organizations related to small and medium-sized enterprises
2007 establishments in Romania